Strathern may refer to:

People 
Andrew Strathern (born 1939), British anthropologist
Marilyn Strathern (born 1941), British anthropologist
Paul Strathern (born 1940), British writer and academic

Places 
Strathern, New Zealand, suburb of Invercargill

Other uses 
 Anderson Strathern

See also 
Strathearn (disambiguation)